In Greek mythology, Iphiclus (Iphiklos) was the name of the following figures:
Iphiclus, other name for Iphicles, son of Alcmene and Amphitryon.
 Iphiclus, a Pleuronian prince as the son of King Thestius and either Laophonte, Leucippe, Deidameia or Eurythemis. He was the brother of Althaea, Leda, Hypermnestra, Evippus, Plexippus and Eurypylus. Iphitus was one of the Argonauts, and a participant in the hunt for the Calydonian Boar, where he was killed by Meleager.
Iphiclus, a Thessalonian man, son of Phylacus and Clymene, brother of Alcimede and Clymenus. He was described by Hesiod as fleet of foot. He was the father of Protesilaus and Podarces by Diomedeia. Iphiclus was cured of infertility by Melampus, and gave him his famous herd of oxen in reward. He is counted among the Argonauts who sailed for Colchis in their quest of the Golden Fleece.
 Iphiclus, a Cretan prince as the son of King Idomeneus and Meda, probably the brother of Orsilochus, Cleisithyra and Lycus. Together with the latter, they were slain by the usurper Leucus.

Notes

References 

 Apollonius Rhodius, Argonautica translated by Robert Cooper Seaton (1853-1915), R. C. Loeb Classical Library Volume 001. London, William Heinemann Ltd, 1912. Online version at the Topos Text Project.
 Apollonius Rhodius, Argonautica. George W. Mooney. London. Longmans, Green. 1912. Greek text available at the Perseus Digital Library.
 Gaius Julius Hyginus, Fabulae from The Myths of Hyginus translated and edited by Mary Grant. University of Kansas Publications in Humanistic Studies. Online version at the Topos Text Project.
 Gaius Valerius Flaccus, Argonautica translated by Mozley, J H. Loeb Classical Library Volume 286. Cambridge, MA, Harvard University Press; London, William Heinemann Ltd. 1928. Online version at theio.com.
 Gaius Valerius Flaccus, Argonauticon. Otto Kramer. Leipzig. Teubner. 1913. Latin text available at the Perseus Digital Library.
 Homer, The Iliad with an English Translation by A.T. Murray, Ph.D. in two volumes. Cambridge, MA., Harvard University Press; London, William Heinemann, Ltd. 1924. Online version at the Perseus Digital Library.
 Homer, Homeri Opera in five volumes. Oxford, Oxford University Press. 1920. Greek text available at the Perseus Digital Library.
 Pseudo-Apollodorus, The Library with an English Translation by Sir James George Frazer, F.B.A., F.R.S. in 2 Volumes, Cambridge, MA, Harvard University Press; London, William Heinemann Ltd. 1921. Online version at the Perseus Digital Library. Greek text available from the same website.
 The Orphic Argonautica, translated by Jason Colavito. © Copyright 2011. Online version at the Topos Text Project.

Argonauts
Princes in Greek mythology
Characters in the Argonautica
Aetolian characters in Greek mythology
Cretan characters in Greek mythology
Thessalian characters in Greek mythology